Vikmanshyttan is a locality situated in Hedemora Municipality, Dalarna County, Sweden with 843 inhabitants in 2010. On site the Steelworks Museum of Vikmanshyttan is maintained as a museum of regional industrial history.

List of patrons
Incomplete
 Anders Angerstein (1614–1659)
 Johan Angerstein (1646–1716)
 Gustaf Angerstein (1686–1734)
 Johan Gustaf Angerstein (1715–1758)
 Johan Fredrik Angerstein (1753–1801)

Gallery

References

External links
 https://gamlavikmanshyttan.se/gamlaindustrin/litemeraomangersteinarna/

Populated places in Dalarna County
Populated places in Hedemora Municipality